Rush Lake is a village in the Canadian province of Saskatchewan within the Rural Municipality of Excelsior No. 166 and Census Division No. 7. Surrounding communities include Waldeck, Herbert, and the City of Swift Current.

History 
Rush Lake incorporated as a village on October 16, 1911.

Demographics 

References

Villages in Saskatchewan
Excelsior No. 166, Saskatchewan
Division No. 7, Saskatchewan